Ross 640 is a white dwarf star in the northern constellation of Hercules, positioned near the constellation border with Corona Borealis. With an apparent visual magnitude of 13.83, it is too faint to be visible to the naked eye.

This compact star has a stellar classification of DZA5.5, indicating a metal-rich atmosphere accompanied by weaker lines of hydrogen. A detailed analysis of its spectrum revealed that Ross 640 is a relatively cool white dwarf with an effective temperature of approximately 8,100 K, which means that it has been in the white dwarf phase for slightly more than 1 billion years. Ross 640 has a spectrum characterized by hydrogen Balmer lines in the visible and very strong ionized magnesium lines in the ultraviolet. The presence of heavy elements in the photosphere of Ross 640 indicates that it recently accreted rocky debris from its planetary system.

References

White dwarfs
Hercules (constellation)
Ross objects
Gliese and GJ objects